Fausto dos Santos (28 January 1905 – 29 March 1939), sometimes known as just Fausto, was a  football (soccer) player, considered one of the best defensive midfielders of Vasco da Gama of the first half of past century. At the time, he and Jaguaré, another famous player at this era, was attempted to be loaned to Barcelona.

Popularly known as "Fausto, The Black Wonder" he was a pioneer to vindicate labor laws to footballers since the professionalization of Brazilian football in the beginning of the 1930s.

He also played for other clubs, such as Bangu, Nacional of Montevideo and Flamengo. He died at the age of 34 of tuberculosis.

Honours

Club
 Campeonato Carioca (2): 
Vasco da Gama: 1929, 1934
 Copa Catalunya (1): 
Barcelona: 1932

External links
Pelé.Net
Milton Neves

1905 births
1939 deaths
Brazilian footballers
Brazil international footballers
CR Vasco da Gama players
CR Flamengo footballers
Bangu Atlético Clube players
Club Nacional de Football players
FC Barcelona players
20th-century deaths from tuberculosis
Tuberculosis deaths in Minas Gerais
Brazilian expatriate sportspeople in Uruguay
Expatriate footballers in Uruguay
Expatriate footballers in Spain
Expatriate footballers in Switzerland
1930 FIFA World Cup players
SC Young Fellows Juventus players
Association football midfielders
Footballers from Rio de Janeiro (city)